Oscilla somersi is a species of sea snail, a marine gastropod mollusk in the family Pyramidellidae, the pyrams and their allies. The species is one of eleven known species within the Boonea genus of gastropods.

Description
The shell grows to a length of approximately 2.6 mm.

Distribution
This marine species occurs in the following locations:
 Bermudas
 Caribbean Sea: Colombia
 Gulf of Mexico: Florida, Louisiana, Texas
 Atlantic Ocean: Bahamas, Bermudas, Brazil

References

 Pimenta A.D., Santos F.N. & Absalão R.S. 2008. Review of the genera Ividia, Folinella, Menestho, Pseudoscilla, Tryptichus and Peristichia (Gastropoda, Pyramidellidae) from Brazil, with descriptions of four new species. The Veliger 50(3): 171-184

External links
 To Encyclopedia of Life
 To World Register of Marine Species
 

Pyramidellidae
Gastropods described in 1900